Adenodolichos baumii is a plant in the legume family Fabaceae, native to tropical Africa.

Description
Inflorescences are terminal, featuring crimson to purplish to near black flowers.

Distribution and habitat
Adenodolichos baumii is native to the Democratic Republic of the Congo, Angola and Zambia. Its habitat is in woodland.

References

baumii
Flora of the Democratic Republic of the Congo
Flora of Angola
Flora of Zambia
Plants described in 1903